Patrik Hansson (born 23 September 1969) is a Swedish former professional footballer who played as a midfielder.

Club career 
During his active career he played for Östers IF and Brann as a midfielder.

Hailing from Växjö, Hansson started his career for the local club Östers IF, and played for the team in Allsvenskan. Hansson transferred to Brann in 1992, where his father Jan Hansson was assistant coach, and played 20 matches and scored three goals for Brann in Tippeligaen.

Hansson later played for Sogndal and Jonsereds IF, before he retired in 1996 due to a knee-injury.

International career 
Hansson played seven games and scored three goals for the Sweden U19 team between 1986 and 1988.

Post-playing career 
Like his father, Hansson has worked as assistant coach of Brann, but he decided to resign from his position after the 2012 season. He has also been assistant coach at Kalmar FF and Hammarby IF after his playing career.

Personal life 
Hansson is the father of the professional footballer Emil Hansson who currently plays for Heracles Almelo.

References

1969 births
Living people
Swedish footballers
Östers IF players
SK Brann players
Sogndal Fotball players
Jonsereds IF players
Allsvenskan players
Eliteserien players
Norwegian First Division players
SK Brann non-playing staff
Swedish expatriate footballers
Expatriate footballers in Norway
Swedish expatriate sportspeople in Norway
Hammarby Fotboll non-playing staff
Association football midfielders